Reiner Knizia is a prolific German-style board game designer.

Early life and education
Born in Germany, he developed his first game at the age of eight. He gained a Master of Science from Syracuse University in the United States and a doctorate in Mathematics from the University of Ulm in Germany. He went on to manage a two-billion-dollar financial company.

Career
Knizia has been a full-time game designer since 1997, when he quit his job from the board of a large international bank. Knizia has been living in England since 1993.

In addition to having designed over 700 published games, Knizia is highly acclaimed as a designer, having won the Deutscher Spiele Preis four times, a Spiel des Jahres (in addition to a Kinderspiel des Jahres and a special award), and numerous other national and international awards. At the Origins Game Fair in 2002 he was inducted into the Gaming Hall of Fame. His games frequently make appearances on various "top games" lists, including the GAMES 100 list, the BoardGameGeek top 100, and the Internet Top 100 Games List. Several gaming conventions host "Kniziathons", which are tournaments dedicated to celebrating Knizia-designed games.

Reiner Knizia started developing games for his play-by-mail game zine Postspillion, founded in 1985. The zine still exists, and the game Bretton Woods (also a Reiner Knizia design), which was started in 1987, is still going.

One of Knizia's best selling games is Lord of the Rings, published in 17 languages with over one million copies sold. His dice game Pickomino has also reached 1 million copies sold and his Keltis sold over 600,000 copies. His game Ingenious has been published in over 20 languages. In 2011, Knizia designed a Star Trek-themed game for NECA/WizKids, based on the 2009 film that 'reset' the Star Trek universe. In 2015 Ravensburger released Star Wars VII - Galaxy Rebellion based on the popular movie franchise.

A number of Knizia designs have been redeveloped for the electronic gaming & console markets. Ingenious (aka Einfach Genial) and Keltis have both appeared in CD-ROM versions; Lost Cities was adapted for Xbox 360 via Xbox Live Arcade. An original game for the Nintendo DS, Dr. Reiner Knizia's Brainbenders was published in 2008; Keltis for the NDS followed in 2009. Other mobile implementations of Knizia titles include Lost Cities, Battle Line, Kingdoms, Medici, Ra, Through the Desert, Samurai and Tigris and Euphrates. Knizia has also designed various game applications specifically for the iPhone, including Robot Master, Dice Monster, Labyrinth and Pipes.

Over several years Knizia has developed a number of hybrid boardgames with electronic components, most notably with German publisher Ravensburger. The first of these was the King Arthur adventure game in 2003, later updated for use with the iPhone in 2014. Other titles include Die Insel, the award-winning Wer War's?, Der Drei ??? and in 2015 Captain Black (notable for a talking ghost pirate captain and a 90 cm - 3 feet - 3D ship).

Game characteristics

Knizia's games cover many board game genres. He has designed small two-player card games, children's games, and even a live-action roleplaying game.

One element of modern game design that Reiner Knizia has pioneered is abstract theme. Older themed games like Monopoly have traditionally developed their themes by trying to model or emulate the environment or situation they are thematically tied to. So Monopoly has players buying and developing properties as a real estate developer might. Knizia's thematic game designs tend not to try to model a specific environment, but instead try to invoke the thought and decision-making processes that are key to the theme. For example, Knizia's game Medici has a fairly abstract game system of drawing and buying cards that does not try to model any particular environment, but in the game-world, the players are always attempting to price risk, the key success factor in the investment banking business in which the Medicis made their fortune. A further example of this can be found in Knizia's game, Tigris and Euphrates. The players each take control of one of four different dynasties of Mesopotamia around 3,000 B.C. Each dynasty has priests, farmers, traders, and kings who are placed strategically on the board. The players take turns expanding their dynasties, controlling rivers, building temples, and attacking the other players' dynasties. Instead of Tigris and Euphrates having many complicated rules, the game is relatively simple and has very streamlined rules that does not attempt to emulate the real-life conflicts but rather abstracts this out, allowing for the players to focus on strategic decision making. This approach has allowed Knizia to develop games that are comparatively simple but require thoughtful game-play, while still retaining strongly thematic elements.

Using his understanding of principles in mathematics to full effect, pricing and evaluating risk are frequently recurring elements in Reiner Knizia games. Many of his most successful designs use auctions as a vehicle to price risk, as in Ra, Medici, and Modern Art.

Games

Some of Knizia's games are:
 Abandon Ship
 Age of War/Risk Express
 Amun-Re
 Winner, Deutscher Spiele Preis 2003
 Nominee, International Gamers Awards—General Strategy; Multiplayer
 Amphipolis
 Auf Heller und Pfennig (released in English as Kingdoms)
 Winner, Origins Award for Best Abstract Board Game of 2002
 Battle Line (released as Schotten-Totten in Germany)
 Beowulf: The Legend
 Blue Moon/Blue Moon Legends
 Blue Moon City
 Clickbait (released by Big Potato Games)
 Drahtseilakt (released as Tightrope and Relationship Tightrope in the US)
 Dream Factory (released as Traumfabrik in Germany and Hollywood Blockbuster)
 Winner, Arets Spel for Best Adult Game
 Einfach Genial (released as Ingenious in the US and Mensa Connections in the UK)
 Winner, Schweizer Spielepreis Best Strategy Game 2004
 High Society (card game)
 Indigo (board game)
 Ivanhoe
 Keltis
 Winner, Spiel des Jahres 2008
LEGO Ramses Pyramid
Loot
 Looting London (card game)
 Lord of the Rings
 Winner, Spiel des Jahres 2001 special prize for best use of literature in a game
 Lord of the Rings: The Confrontation
 Lost Cities
 Winner, International Gamers Award 2000 for Best 2-player strategy game
 Medici
 Modern Art
 Winner, Deutscher Spiele Preis 1993
 Winner, Finnish Game of the Year 2008
 My City (board game)
 My Word!
 Orongo
 Pickomino/Heckmeck
 Prosperity
 Co-designed with Sebastian Bleasdale
 Qin (board game)
 Ra
 Nominee, 2000 International Gamers Awards—General Strategy; Multi-player
 Samurai
 (Do You Know) Shakespeare?
 Star Trek: Expeditions
 Star Wars VII - Galaxy Rebellion
 Taj Mahal
 Winner, Deutscher Spiele Preis 2000
 Winner, Essen Feather 2000
 Through the Desert
 Tigris and Euphrates
 Winner, Deutscher Spiele Preis 1998 for Best Family/Adult Game
 Recommended, Spiel des Jahres 1998
 Tower of Babel
 Winner, Schweizer Spielepreis best strategy game 2005
 Vampire
 Wer war's/Who Was It?
 Winner, Kinderspiel des Jahres 2008
 Winner, Deutscher Kinderspiele Preis 2008
Wettlauf nach El Dorado/The Quest for El Dorado
 Nominee, Spiel des Jahres 2017
 Winner's Circle (board game)

See also
Going Cardboard (Documentary, includes an interview with Reiner Knizia)

References

External links
 Knizia Games
 Reiner Knizia video interview at Submarine Channel, 15 November 2011
 Postspillion 
  (includes complete list of games)
 Reiner Knizia at Math Genealogy Project
 Reiner Knizia by the Numbers, interview with Reiner Knizia, 12 April 2006

Living people
Board game designers
1957 births
People from Illertissen